Michel Franco (born 28 August 1979) is a Mexican film director, screenwriter and producer. He is best known for his film After Lucia that won the Prize Un Certain Regard at the 2012 Cannes Film Festival. 

His films typically deal with themes of dysfunctional families, in particular Mexican upper classes. His 2020 film New Order was received with an overwhelming backlash due to accusations of racism towards lower classes in Mexico to the point that Franco had to make a public apology in social media as he claimed the film was the subject of "reverse racism".

Although many of his films have been poorly received by Mexican critics and audiences, Franco has received numerous awards in film festivals like Cannes, Venice and Chicago.

Selected filmography

As director
 Daniel & Ana (2009)
 After Lucia (2012)
 Through the Eyes (2013)
 Chronic (2015)
 April's Daughter (2017)
 New Order (2020)
 Sundown (2021)

As producer
 From Afar (2015)
 600 Miles (2015)
 Heroic (2023)

References

External links

1979 births
Living people
Mexican film producers
Film directors from Mexico City
Cannes Film Festival Award for Best Screenplay winners